is a 2D fighting game for the Nintendo 3DS that is based on the Dragon Ball franchise. It is the sixth game in the Butōden series, following 2011's Dragon Ball Kai: Ultimate Butoden, and returns to the using Dragon Ball Z branding.

The game was released on June 11, 2015, in Japan, October 16, 2015, in Europe and Australia and October 20, 2015, in North America.

Development
The game was first revealed at NintendoEverything.com on February 17, 2015.
On June 13, 2015, a retailer added a poster hinting a possible localization.

Release
An additional patch, released in November 2016 in Japan, allows support for local or online multiplayer, crossover cross-play between the game and One Piece: Great Pirate Colosseum, which was also developed by Arc System Works.

Reception

Extreme Butōden currently has a score of 60/100 on Metacritic. Destructoid awarded it a score of 5 out of 10, saying "It's a competent fighter with nice sprite work, but it also does very little interesting with narrative presentation, combat mechanics, or gameplay modes."

The game sold 74,660 copies within its first week of release in Japan. By the end of the year, it had sold 150,989 copies in Japan.

References 

2015 video games
Arc System Works games
Bandai Namco games
Extreme Butōden
Fighting games
Multiplayer and single-player video games
Nintendo 3DS eShop games
Nintendo 3DS games
Nintendo 3DS-only games
Nintendo Network games
Video games developed in Japan